Mallory v. Norfolk Southern Railway Co. (Docket 21–1168) is a pending United States Supreme Court case related to personal jurisdiction.

Background 

Robert Mallory sued Norfolk Southern Railway in the Pennsylvania Court of Common Pleas under the Federal Employers Liability Act, asserting his work for the corporation exposed him to carcinogens. Mallory had worked for the railroad in Ohio and Virginia, and both he and the company resided in Virginia at the time as well. The sole basis for personal jurisdiction over the company in Pennsylvania was that it had implicitly consented by registering to do business in the commonwealth. In Pennoyer v. Neff, the Supreme Court delivered a major ruling on personal jurisdiction, which was later upended by the International Shoe Co. v. Washington decision. The Supreme Court of Pennsylvania sided with the railroad, ruling that consent-by-registration jurisdiction violates the Due Process Clause of the Fourteenth Amendment to the United States Constitution, applying recent precedents.

Mallory filed a petition for a writ of certiorari.

Supreme Court 

Certiorari was granted in the case on April 25, 2022.

References

External links 
 

2023 in United States case law
United States Supreme Court cases
United States Supreme Court cases of the Roberts Court
United States personal jurisdiction case law